Takto Youtiya Homrasmy (born 25 March 1956) is a Laotian boxer. He competed in the men's featherweight event at the 1980 Summer Olympics.

References

External links
 

1956 births
Living people
Laotian male boxers
Olympic boxers of Laos
Boxers at the 1980 Summer Olympics
Place of birth missing (living people)
Featherweight boxers